Jan Hansen (born 14 February 1955) is a retired Norwegian footballer who played for Ranheim, Rosenborg BK and Norway. He played 252 league matches for Rosenborg, ranking fifth overall in the club history. He was capped 19 times for Norway.

References

External links

1955 births
Living people
Norwegian footballers
Norway international footballers
Ranheim Fotball players
Rosenborg BK players
Eliteserien players
Footballers from Trondheim
Association football midfielders